International standard ISO 2145 defines a typographic convention for the "numbering of divisions and subdivisions in written documents". It applies to any kind of document, including manuscripts, books, journal articles, and standards.

Description

The ISO 2145 numbering scheme is defined by the following rules:

 Only Arabic numerals (1, 2, 3, …) are used.
 The main divisions are numbered continuously starting from 1.
 Each main division (first level) can be divided further into subdivisions (second level), which are equally continuously numbered. This can be continued for further levels of subdivision.
 A full stop is placed between numbers that designate subdivisions of different levels. No full stop is placed after the number that designates the final subdivision.
 A number 0 (zero) can be assigned to the first division of each level if it forms an introduction, preface, foreword, or the like.

Example

A table of contents might look like:

Citations

Division and subdivision numbers are cited in written text as in:

 … in chapter 4 …
 … as lemma 3.4.27 shows …
 … the 3rd paragraph in 2.4.1.7 …

In spoken language, the full stops are omitted:

 "… in chapter four …"
 "… as lemma three four twenty-seven shows …"
 "… the third paragraph in two four one seven …"

Support in word processing software

 All standard LaTeX document classes generate chapter, section, subsection, figure, table, etc. numbers as defined by ISO 2145.
 As of 2003, all Microsoft Word versions were by default set up to add a full stop after the final section number. This does not conform to ISO 2145. However, users can change style settings to match the ISO standard. In Word 16, for example, in the “Styles pane”, right-clicking on the relevant heading style to select “Modify Style”, then following Format/Numbering.../Outline Numbered leads to a graphical choice of numbering styles that includes one closely matching ISO 2145, which can then be customized to remove any trailing dot.

See also
 Decimal section numbering
 Decimal separator
 Dot-decimal notation

References

 International Standard ISO 2145:1978, Documentation — Numbering of divisions and subdivisions in written documents. International Organization for Standardization, Geneva. (paywalled)
 
 British Standard  BS 5848:1980, Specification for numbering of divisions and subdivisions in written documents (point-numbering).

02145
Typography